Dejan "Danny" Milosevic (born 26 June 1978) is the goalkeeper coach at Perth Glory FC. A former Australian Under-20 & 23s international, Milosevic appeared at the  World Youth Cup in 1997 and the 2000 Olympic Games.

Biography
Milosevic started off his professional career with the Canberra Cosmos in the old NSL and captained the Under-20s Australian side to the World Youth Cup in 1997 playing alongside the likes of Vince Grella and Brett Emerton with the Young Socceroos. They produced the shock of the tournament defeating eventual winners Argentina 4–3 in the group stages.
 
He moved overseas to play in  Germany before joining Perth Glory where he was a high-profile signing under popular new coach Bernd Stange in 1998.

Milosevic moved to Leeds United F.C. for £110,000 after only one season at the Perth Glory and he hardly ever got a chance with the likes of England number two Nigel Martyn and then England number one Paul Robinson ahead of him. He was eventually released by Leeds United F.C. after five years at the club and was signed up on a "pay as you play" contract by Celtic. He left the club without playing after citing personal problems.

Milosevic never returned to Glasgow, and was without a club until he joined the New Zealand Knights for the inaugural A-League season on the advice of former glory teammate Danny Hay. The Knights first season was a disaster, often due to Milosevic's form. "We all make mistakes and Danny would be the first to hold his hand up to some of the errors that he's made this year," Adshead said. He was eventually demoted to the bench with All-Whites keeper Paston ahead of him.

Soon after New Zealand Knights' new manager Paul Nevin signed another goalkeeper, Michael Turnbull, to battle for Milosevic's for the A-league's second season. "That's how the game normally works. You wait for your chance through injury or form and take it. You put your head down in training, show the coach what you can do, and fight for the No 1 spot". Paul Nevin.

Before the close of the A-League's second season Milosevic was released by the club seen surplus to its requirements.

Milosevic is now owner of One 2 One football, a football coaching, promotion, consultation and worldwide football marketing company. A new brand of Goalkeeping gloves designed by Milosevic called XSENTR1Q was launched recently onto the worldwide market.

Milosevic accepted the position of Director of Football at newly promoted NPLV club Ballarat Red Devils in December 2013 ahead of the inaugural 2014 NPLV season. He was motivated to work with the club's youth academy.

Milosevic was Goalkeeper coach with the Australian Women's team (Matildas) finishing second in the Asian Cup for Women in Vietnam 2104.

He is currently goalkeeper coach at Perth Glory FC.

References

External links
 New Zealand Knights Profile
 XSENTR1Q

1978 births
Living people
Australian people of Serbian descent
Australian expatriate sportspeople in England
Australian expatriate sportspeople in Germany
Soccer players from Melbourne
Association football goalkeepers
Australian expatriate soccer players
Olympic soccer players of Australia
Footballers at the 2000 Summer Olympics
A-League Men players
National Soccer League (Australia) players
Arminia Bielefeld players
Celtic F.C. players
Crewe Alexandra F.C. players
Leeds United F.C. players
New Zealand Knights FC players
Perth Glory FC players
Plymouth Argyle F.C. players
Wolverhampton Wanderers F.C. players
Expatriate association footballers in New Zealand
Expatriate footballers in Germany
Expatriate footballers in England
Expatriate footballers in Scotland
Australian soccer players
Australian expatriate sportspeople in New Zealand
Australian expatriate sportspeople in Scotland